Kim Il-sung was the founder and first leader of North Korea. Jane Portal, the author of Art Under Control in North Korea, assesses that: "[i]t is probably the case that Kim Il-sung [had] more buildings named after him during his lifetime than any other leader in history". North Korea claims that "[m]ore than 480 streets, institutions and organizations in 100 countries were named after Kim Il Sung". Since Kim Il-sung's name Il-sung can mean "the Sun", many things named after him are actually called this way.

List

Education and research
Kim Il-sung College for Physics (김일성고등물리학교) – located in Pochon County, Ryanggang Province and named to commemorate the 1937 Battle of Pochonbo
Kim Il-sung Military University – school for selected commissioned officers.
Kim Il-sung University – called that since it opened in 1946
 Kim Il-sung University of Politics

Kim Il-sung Higher Party School – the country's top school for the selected few
Kim Il-sung Research Institute of Agricultural Science – in Guinea
 "Kim Il-sung Research Institute" – generic name for classrooms in large elementary schools dedicated to studying Kim Il-sung
 Research Center for Comrade Kim Il-sung's Revolutionary Thoughts(김일성동지혁명사상연구실) – formerly the Research Center for Workers' Party of Korea History
Kim Il-sung Library – in Mogadishu, Somalia
Kim Il-sung Library – in Sofia, Bulgaria

Museums
South Hamgyong Museum of the Revolutionary Activities of Comrade Kim Il-sung(함경남도김일성동지혁명사적관) – in Hamhung, South Hamgyong Province
Sinuiju Museum of the Revolutionary Activities of Comrade Kim Il-sung – in Sinuiju, North Pyongan Province
South Pyongan Museum of the Revolutionary Activities of Comrade Kim Il-sung – in Pyongsong, South Pyongan Province
Kim Il-sung Revolutionary Museum – in Chongjin
Chagang Provincial Comrade Kim Il-sung Revolutionary Museum – in Chagang Province
Museum of President Kim Il-sung's Revolutionary Activities – in Wonsan, Kangwon Province
Museum of President Kim Il-sung's Revolutionary Activities – in Ryanggang Province

Streets, squares and parks

Kim Il-sung Square, Pyongyang, North Korea 
Several streets in foreign countries. North Korea claims 450 in 100 countries. There is a "Kim Il-sung Street" or equivalent in:
Hamhung, North Korea
Maputo, Mozambique
Phnom Penh, Cambodia
Damascus, Syria
Kim Il-sung Park in Damascus, Syria. Inaugurated in 2015.

Awards
Kim Il-sung Award
Kim Il-sung Medal
 Kim Il-sung Prize
 International Kim Il-sung Prize
Order of Kim Il-sung
Kim Il-sung Youth Honor Prize
Kim Il-sung Children Honor Prize

Other

"Song of General Kim Il-sung" – composed by Kim Won-gyun in 1946, its lyrics are carved in stones across the country
Kim Il-sung Stadium – formerly Pyongyang Municipal Stadium
"Kimilsungism" – guiding ideology of the country, containing the Juche idea, officially reorganised as "Kimilsungism" in 1974
Kimilsungia – an orchid presented to Kim Il-sung by Indonesia's leader Sukarno in 1965 and named after Kim when introduced to North Korea in 1977
Kim Il-sung Socialist Youth League – named by Kim Jong-il in 1996 after Kim Il-sung's death two years earlier, subsequently renamed Kimilsungist-Kimjongilist Youth League in 2016, then the Socialist Patriotic Youth League in 2021
"Kim Il-sung Constitution" – name of the 1998 constitution, that made Kim Il-sung the Eternal President of the country after his death
"Kimilsungism-Kimjongilism" - guiding ideology of the party since 2012, named after Kim Il-sung and Kim Jong-il
"Kim Il-sung and Kim Jong-il Constitution" -  name of the current constitution introduced in 2012, made Kim Jong-il Eternal Chairman of the National Defence Commission after his death

Named after the Sun
Day of the Sun – designated in 1997 after a three-year mourning period following the death of Kim Il-sung
Kumsusan Palace of the Sun - mausoleum where Kim Il-sung and Kim Jong-il lie in state

Proposed namings
"Kim Il-sung City" – proposed name for Pyongyang after Kim Il-sung's death. Another proposal was to name Pyongyang "Kim Jong-il City" and name Seoul "Kim Il-sung City" once reunification would be attained.

See also

Kim Il-sung bibliography
Kim Il-sung and Kim Jong-il badges
National symbols of North Korea
List of things named after Fidel Castro
Awards and decorations received by Kim Il-sung

References

Works cited

List of things named after Kim Il-Sung
North Korea-related lists
Lists of things named after politicians
Society-related lists